Üsdaghi (also Romanized as Üsdāğı) is a village in Bonab Rural District, in the Central District of Marand County, East Azerbaijan Province, Iran. At the 2006 census, its population was 576, in 185 families.

References 

Populated places in Marand County